Kuzhuping Township is an rural township in Sangzhi County, Zhangjiajie, Hunan Province, China.

Administrative division
The township is divided into 11 villages, the following areas: Chenjiaya Village, Yinshiping Village, Jinzishan Village, Kayu Village, Shilongping Village, Zhangjiawan Village, Kuzhuping Village, Nongkezhan Village, Miaoerzhuang Village, Shiziping Village, and Guluojie Village (陈家亚村、银市坪村、金子山村、卡峪村、市龙坪村、张家湾村、苦竹坪村、农科站村、苗儿庄村、狮子坪村、古罗界村).

References

External links

Former towns and townships of Sangzhi County